Parole, Inc. is a 1948 American film noir film directed by Alfred Zeisler and starring Michael O'Shea, Turhan Bey, Evelyn Ankers and Virginia Lee.

Plot
FBI agent Richard Hendricks lies in a hospital bed, dictating the results of his investigation for a report to the California governor. In long flashback scenes, the investigation is reviewed. Following a number of paroles granted to dangerous career criminals, the governor and state attorney general suspect corruption with the state parole board. Hendricks investigates undercover as an ex-convict attempting to buy a parole for a criminal partner currently in jail. He infiltrates the social circle of another recent parolee of dubious character, Harry Palmer, and asks him how to purchase a parole. The perpetrators of the scandal are secretive and willing to take extreme measures to prevent their exposure.

Cast
 Michael O'Shea as Richard Hendricks
 Turhan Bey as Barney Rodescu
 Evelyn Ankers as Jojo Dumont
 Virginia Lee as Glenda Palmer
 Charles Bradstreet as Harry Palmer
 Lyle Talbot as Police Commissioner Hughes
 Michael Whalen as Kid Redmond
 Charles Williams as Titus Jones
 James Cardwell as Duke Vigili
 Paul Bryar as Charley Newton
 Noel Cravat as Blackie Olson
 Charles Jordan as Monty Cooper

Reception
In a contemporary review, critic Edwin Schallert of the Los Angeles Times called the film "exceptionally good" and wrote: "Michael O'Shea as a government investigator does a fine, clean-cut job which will have the studios questing for him with regularity. The film is well directed by Alfred Zeisler, and has an okay documentary flavor."

References

External links
 
 
 
 
 
 
  (public domain)

1948 films
1948 crime films
American crime films
American black-and-white films
Eagle-Lion Films films
Films directed by Alfred Zeisler
1940s English-language films
1940s American films